A Father's Legacy to his Daughters is a book, written by Dr John Gregory (1724 – 1773), Scottish physician, medical writer and moralist. 

Dr Gregory wrote A Father's Legacy to his Daughters after the death of his wife in 1761, in order to honour her memory and record her thoughts on female education. He meant only to give the text to his daughters when he died. His son James had it published in 1774; a year following Gregory's death. It became a best-seller, going through many editions and translations. In writing this work, Gregory may have been influenced by the celebrated Bluestocking Elizabeth Montagu. The text advises parents and women on religion, moral conduct, friendship and interactions with men, with a focus on marriage. He suggested that women should refrain from exposing any learning that they might have, as this would damage their ability to attract a husband. Mary Wollstonecraft would later attack these principles in A Vindication of the Rights of Woman (1792), arguing that Gregory's advice amounted to nothing more than deceit on the part of women.

This book was imported to America, where it also went through several editions and reprints. There was an 1801 edition printed by Warner and Hanna for John Conrad and Company, which was published in Baltimore. While the original text states that "... a woman in this country has very little probability for marrying for love", a footnote in this edition contains commentary on this, which states that "These observations are happily inapplicable in America, although perfectly just in Great Britain."

References

External links
 

1774 non-fiction books
History of women in the United Kingdom
Books published posthumously
Women and education
Fatherhood